The Parent Trap is a 1961 American romantic comedy film written and directed by David Swift. It stars Hayley Mills (in a dual role) as a pair of teenage twins plotting to reunite their divorced parents by switching places with each other. Maureen O'Hara, and Brian Keith play the parents. Although the plot is very close to that of the 1945 film Twice Blessed, The Parent Trap is based on the 1949 book Lisa and Lottie by Erich Kästner.

Produced by Walt Disney Productions, The Parent Trap was released on June 21, 1961, by Buena Vista Distribution. It grossed $25.1 million at the box office and was nominated for two Academy Awards. It was broadcast on television, and three television sequels followed the later adventures of the twins. The film was remade in 1998 with Lindsay Lohan. It was released on VHS, in digital stereo LaserDisc format (1986), and on DVD (2002). The Parent Trap was the second of six films Mills made for Disney.

Plot 
Teenagers Sharon McKendrick and Susan Evers meet at Miss Inch's Summer Camp for Girls. Their identical appearance causes jealousy, resentment, and a rivalry in which they continually get each other into trouble and disrupt camp activities. As punishment, they must spend the remainder of the camp season rooming and dining together in isolation. They overcome their mutual dislike when they discover that they are identical twin sisters, whom their parents Mitch Evers and Maggie McKendrick separated upon divorcing shortly after their birth. Eager to meet the parents from whom they were separated, they decide to switch places, cut their hair identically, and coach each other on their lives.

In Boston with her mother and grandparents, Susan poses as Sharon, while Sharon goes to Mitch's California ranch as Susan. Sharon learns that Mitch is engaged to a beautiful and much younger woman, gold digger Vicky Robinson, who intends to send Susan to boarding school after the wedding. The girls communicate by phone at night. Susan tells Sharon to break up the couple, but when that fails, Susan decides to end the charade. After a happy reunion, Maggie brings her to California. Mitch is upset by Maggie's unexpected arrival, until he learns the truth and is reunited with both daughters. Vicky is jealous of Maggie, who is staying at the ranch.

The girls scheme to reunite their parents by recreating Maggie and Mitch's first date. At first, the ex-spouses are drawn together, but then they argue over why they divorced. They make up before Maggie and Sharon are to leave the next morning, and Maggie wishes Mitch well with Vicky. To delay the return to Boston, the twins dress alike, so their parents cannot tell them apart. They refuse to reveal their identities unless the family takes a camping trip. Mitch and Maggie reluctantly agree, and Vicky, who loathes the outdoors, is furious. Maggie cajoles Vicky into taking her place "so that Vicky can become better acquainted with the twins."

The twins take every opportunity to exploit Vicky's hatred of camping, pulling a series of pranks on her. That night, the twins sneak into her tent and pour honey on her feet. The next morning, Vicky screams she awakens to bear cubs start licking her feet. Mitch finally sees Vicky's true nature when she throws a tantrum, angrily slaps Susan, and storms off enraged to the city, for good.

Back at the house, the twins apologize for their actions. Maggie and Sharon prepare to return to Boston the next day, the twins now resigned to seeing each other only during visits and shuttling back and forth between parents. Later, Mitch tells Maggie everything he misses about her and their marriage. They realize that they still love each other. Susan wakes up during the night and tells Sharon about a beautiful dream she has, where they are bridesmaids at their parents' wedding, a dream destined to come true.

Cast
 Hayley Mills as Sharon McKendrick / Susan Evers, identical twins who were separated shortly after birth when their parents divorced. They learn of each other's existence at a summer camp.
 Brian Keith as Mitchell "Mitch" Evers, Sharon and Susan's father.
 Maureen O'Hara as Margaret "Maggie" McKendrick, Sharon and Susan's mother.
 Joanna Barnes as Vicky Robinson, a child-hating gold digger who is planning to marry Mitch for his money.
 Charlie Ruggles as Charles McKendrick 
 Cathleen Nesbitt as Louise McKendrick
 Una Merkel as Verbena, The Housekeeper
 Leo G. Carroll as Reverend Dr. Mosby
 Linda Watkins as Edna Robinson
 Ruth McDevitt as Miss Abbey Inch
 Crahan Denton as Hecky, The Ranch Foreman
 Nancy Kulp as Miss Grunecker
 Frank De Vol as Mr. Eaglewood
 Susan Henning as Sharon McKendrick / Susan Evers (body double) [uncredited]

Production 
The novel was discovered by Disney's story editor Bill Dover, who recommended the studio buy it.

In March 1960 Disney announced that Hayley Mills would star in His and Hers to be written and directed by David Swift. Swift and Mills had just made Pollyanna for Disney. It was also known as Petticoats and Blue Jeans and was the first in a five-film contract Mills signed with Disney, to make one each summer.

Maureen O'Hara signed in June. She wrote in her memoirs that Disney offered her a third of her normal fee of $75,000 but that she held out for her quote and got it. O'Hara said her contract gave her top billing but that Disney decided to give that to Mills; she says this caused tension with the studio and was why she never worked with Disney again.

Production started in July under the title of We Belong Together and went until September.

The film was shot mostly at various locales in California. The summer camp scenes were filmed at Bluff Lake Camp (then owned by the Pasadena YMCA, now by Habonim Dror's Camp Gilboa) and the family camping scenes later in the movie at Cedar Lake Camp, both in the San Bernardino Mountains near the city of Big Bear Lake in Southern California. The Monterey scenes were filmed in various California locations, including millionaire Stuyvesant Fish's  ranch in Carmel and Monterey's Pebble Beach golf course. The scenes at the Monterey house were shot at the studio's Golden Oak Ranch in Placerita Canyon, where Mitch's ranch was built. It was the design of this set that proved the most popular, and to this day the Walt Disney Archives receives requests for plans of the home's interior design. In fact, there never was such a house; the set was simply various rooms built on a sound stage. Camp Inch was based on a real girls' camp called Camp Crestridge for Girls at the Ridgecrest Baptist Conference Center near Asheville, North Carolina.

Musical numbers 
Richard and Robert Sherman provided the songs, which, besides the title song "The Parent Trap", includes "For Now, For Always", and "Let's Get Together".  "Let's Get Together" (sung by Annette Funicello) is heard playing from a record player at the summer camp; the tune is reprised by the twins when they restage their parents' first date and that version is sung double-tracked by Hayley Mills (Hayley's own single of the song, credited to "Hayley Mills and Hayley Mills", reached #8 on the US charts). The film's title song was performed by Tommy Sands and Annette Funicello, who were both on the studio lot shooting Babes in Toyland at the time. The campers whistle the 1914 marching song, "Colonel Bogey March", as they march through camp, mirroring the scene from The Bridge on the River Kwai.

Reception

Critical
Bosley Crowther of The New York Times wrote that "it should be most appealing to adults, as well as to children, because of the cheerfully persuasive dual performance of Hayley Mills". Variety stated that the film was "absolutely predictable from the outset", but was still "a winner" thanks to the performance of Mills, who "seems to have an instinctive sense of comedy and an uncanny ability to react in just the right manner. Her contribution to the picture is virtually infinite". Charles Stinson of the Los Angeles Times declared it "a comedy unusually well designed for the entire family — enough sight gags to keep the children screaming and enough clever dialogue to amuse their parents". Harrison's Reports graded the film as "Very Good" and Richard L. Coe of The Washington Post called it "charmingly lively" even though "the terrain is familiar".

The film holds a score of 90% on Rotten Tomatoes based on 20 reviews.

Box Office
The film was a huge success at the box office. It grossed an estimated $9.3 million in the US.

Accolades 
The film was nominated for two Academy Awards: one for Sound by Robert O. Cook, and the other for Film Editing by Philip W. Anderson. The film and its editor, Philip W. Anderson, won the inaugural 1962 Eddie Award of the American Cinema Editors.

Subsequent developments 

In 1961, a comic book version of the film was published, adapted, and illustrated by Dan Spiegle.

The film was theatrically re-released in 1968 and earned $1.8 million in rentals.

The Disney Studios produced three television sequels The Parent Trap II (1986),  Parent Trap III (1989) and Parent Trap: Hawaiian Honeymoon (1989). The original was remade in 1998 starring Lindsay Lohan, Dennis Quaid, and Natasha Richardson. Joanna Barnes also made an appearance as Vicki Blake, the mother of Dennis Quaid's character's fiancée, Meridith. Another remake of The Parent Trap is in development for Walt Disney Studios' streaming service Disney+.

In India, there have been several films inspired by The Parent Trap. In 1965, a Tamil language version of the story called Kuzhandaiyum Deivamum, starring Kutty Padmini was released. The following year, it was remade into Telugu as Leta Manasulu also starring Kutty Padmini. A Hindi version Do Kaliyaan starring Neetu Singh in the double role was made in 1968. The 1987 film Pyar Ke Kabil also has a similar storyline, as does the 2001 film Kuch Khatti Kuch Meethi which has Kajol playing the double role of 23-year-old twins.

Home media 
The film was released on a 2-disc special edition DVD in 2002, as part of the Vault Disney collection, with a new digital remaster by THX.

In 2005, the film was once again released in a 2-Movie Collection, which also contained the made-for-television sequel, The Parent Trap II (1986), plus the original film trailer and other bonus features.

The film was released for the first time on Blu-ray, but as a Disney Movie Club exclusive on April 24, 2018. The 1998 remake was also released on Blu-ray the same day.

See also 
 List of American films of 1961

References

Notes

External links 

 
 
 
 
 

1961 films
Films about teenagers
1960s English-language films
1961 musical comedy films
1961 romantic comedy films
American children's comedy films
American musical comedy films
American romantic comedy films
American remakes of German films
Comedy of remarriage films
Films scored by Paul Smith (film and television composer)
Films about twin sisters
Films about families
Films about pranks
Films about weddings
Films adapted into comics
Films based on German novels
Films based on Lottie and Lisa
Films directed by David Swift
Films set in Boston
Films set in California
1
Films about summer camps
Walt Disney Pictures films
1960s children's comedy films
Twins in American films
1960s American films